The 317th Platoon is a 1965 French black-and-white war film set during the First Indochina War (1946–54) written and directed by Pierre Schoendoerffer.  The film was based on Schoendoerffer's 1963 novel of the same name.

Plot
In 1954 while the Battle of Dien Bien Phu is being fought, the 317th Platoon, composed of Laotian suppletive troops, a French officer and several NCOs, is ordered to go to the Tao-Tsai post in North Cambodia. From there it hopes to reach friendly ground and evacuation towards Kratieh on the Mekong.

The leaders of the platoon are the fresh Second-Lieutenant Torrens and Warrant Officer (Adjudant) Willsdorff, a highly experienced soldier who is in his third turn in Indochina. Willsdorff is an Alsatian who was incorporated by force in the German Wehrmacht and fought on the Russian front.

One of the NCOs Sergeant Roudier is mortally wounded in an early encounter set off unnecessarily by his officer's verve. The Laotian troops place their trust in cautious Willsdorff who knows the ropes and leads hardly by proxy through the marshes and tropical forests of Cambodia.

Meager supplies are parachuted to the platoon by a friendly plane but part of the load is dropped into enemy lines. Fatality strikes and Lt Torrens eventually dies. Willsdorf leaves him to take refuge with Moï mountain tribes.

Cast
 Jacques Perrin as 2nd Lt Torrens
 Bruno Cremer as L'adjudant Willsdorf
 Pierre Fabre as Sgt Roudier
 Manuel Zarzo as caporal Perrin, radio operator
  as sergent supplétif Ba Kut

Production
Schoendoerffer had been a POW in Vietnam following the French defeat at the Battle of Dien Bien Phu.

The film was shot with a crew of six in the middle of a Cambodian forest during the rainy season. Extreme realism is constant throughout a gripping film shot barely ten years after the actual events took place. French military routine, drills and jargon are perfectly depicted. "I imposed a strict military regime on everyone," Schoendoerffer said. "A war film shouldn't be made in comfort."
ct".

Reception
It was entered into the 1965 Cannes Film Festival where it won the award for Best Screenplay. It was the 21st most popular film at the French box office in 1965.

Legacy
In 2018, military historian Sir Antony Beevor named The 317th Platoon as "the greatest war movie ever made", "followed closely by 1966's The Battle of Algiers".

References

External links

1965 films
1960s French-language films
French war films
First Indochina War films
French black-and-white films
Films directed by Pierre Schoendoerffer
Films based on French novels
1965 war films
1960s French films